Michael Farquhar may refer to:

Michael Farquhar, author of A Treasury of Foolishly Forgotten Americans
Sir Michael Farquhar, 7th Baronet (born 1938), of the Farquhar baronets

See also
Farquhar (surname)